Phantom of the City is an album by pianist George Cables recorded in 1985 and released on the Contemporary label.

Reception

Scott Yanow of AllMusic said "Cables has long been a talented player in what could be called the 'modern mainstream': not breaking down any new boundaries but developing his own style in the flexible boundaries of hard bop. This album is an excellent example of his talents". The Penguin Guide to Jazz describes the album as a "beautifully balanced piano trio record".

Track listing
All compositions by George Cables except as indicated
 "Phantom of the City" – 5:15
 "Old Folks" (Dedette Lee Hill, Willard Robison) – 5:12
 "But He Knows" – 4:35
 "Dark Side/Light Side" – 5:20
 "Waltz for Monday" (James Leary) – 5:45
 "Blue Nights" – 6:43
 "You Stepped Out of a Dream" (Nacio Herb Brown, Gus Kahn) – 5:36

Personnel
George Cables – piano
John Heard – bass 
Tony Williams – drums

References

Contemporary Records albums
George Cables albums
1985 albums